South Yuba may refer to:
South Yuba, California, in Yuba County
South Yuba City, California, in Sutter County
South Yuba Canal Office, a California Historical Landmark
South Yuba River in California

See also
 South Yuba River State Park
 Yuba (disambiguation)